Janea Padilha is a beautician, entrepreneur and author, best known for popularizing Brazilian bikini waxing. In 2010, she released the book Brazilian Sexy, co-authored with Martha Frankel.

She co-operates the J. Sisters salon in New York City, famous for having celebrity clients such as Vanessa Williams.

References 

Year of birth missing (living people)
Living people
Hair removal
Brazilian writers